Foel Cwm Sian Llŵyd is a subsidiary summit of Cyrniau Nod in north east Wales. It forms a part of the Berwyn range known as the Hirnantau. Its summit has the Snowdonia National Park boundary running through it, and is the most easterly 2000 ft summit in the park.

The views from the summit are extensive, if unremarkable due to the featureless, flat moorland surroundings.  The summit is marked by a trig point. At the northern end of the summit area lies a ruined stone tower.

References

Llangywer
Mountains and hills of Gwynedd
Mountains and hills of Snowdonia
Hewitts of Wales
Nuttalls